The Tigers of Mompracem (original title: Le Tigri di Mompracem) is an exotic adventure novel written by Italian author Emilio Salgari, published in 1900. It features his most famous character, Sandokan.

It was adapted into a 1970 film The Tigers of Mompracem directed by Mario Sequi.

Plot introduction
Would you be the greatest pirate in the South China Sea or would you hang up your sword to be with the woman you love? Malaysia, 1849. The Tigers of Mompracem are a band of rebel pirates fighting against the colonial power of the Dutch and British empires. They are led by Sandokan, the indomitable Tiger of Malaysia, and his loyal friend Yanez De Gomera, a Portuguese wanderer and adventurer. After twelve years of spilling blood and spreading terror throughout Malaysia, Sandokan has reached the height of his power, but when the pirate learns of the extraordinary "Pearl of Labuan", his fortunes begin to change.

Characters
 Sandokan - The Tiger of Malaysia, leader of the Tigers of Mompracem
 Lady Marianna Guillonk - The Pearl of Labuan
 Yanez De Gomera - A Portuguese adventurer, second in command to Sandokan
 Lord James Guillonk - Marianna's uncle
 Baron William Rosenthal - A British officer
 Patan
 Giro-Batol
 Juioko

See also

Novels in the Sandokan Series:
 The Mystery of the Black Jungle
 The Pirates of Malaysia
 The Two Tigers
 The King of the Sea
 Quest for a Throne

Novels in The Black Corsair series:
 The Black Corsair
 The Queen of the Caribbean
 Son of the Red Corsair

Captain Tempesta novels:
 Captain Tempesta
 The Lion of Damascus

External links
  
 Read the first chapter.
 Read a review of Sandokan: The Tigers of Mompracem at SBTB.com.
 Italy’s enduring love affair with Emilio Salgari, The Economist, June 2017
 The Tiger of Malaysia, Barga News
 Read a review of the Sandokan series at SFSite.com.
 Read a review at Pirates and Privateers.
 Read a Sandokan Biography.
 Read about the historical Sandokan.

1900 novels
Novels by Emilio Salgari
Italian adventure novels
19th-century Italian novels
Italian books
Italian novels adapted into films